The McFall House was a residence in Anderson, South Carolina. Andrew McFall, a local farmer,  constructed the house in 1825. The house was listed on the National Register of Historic Places in June 1982 and removed from the register on December 8, 2005. The McFall House was Anderson's oldest brick house.

References

Former National Register of Historic Places in South Carolina
Houses in Anderson County, South Carolina
Houses on the National Register of Historic Places in South Carolina
National Register of Historic Places in Anderson County, South Carolina
Houses completed in 1825